The Grocer is a British magazine devoted to grocery sales, published by William Reed Business Media. It has been published since 1862.

The Grocer 33
A feature of the magazine is 'The Grocer 33'. This is a survey of each of the 5 leading supermarkets' (Asda, Morrisons, Sainsbury's, Tesco and Waitrose) prices and availability on a range of 33 popular lines and published in each issue. The survey is conducted by "mystery shoppers" and different branches in varying parts of the country are used for each week's survey. The supermarkets place prominence on this feature and ASDA heavily promotes the fact it has been the lowest-priced supermarket in The Grocer's survey for the past fifteen years.

Industry awards
The Grocer runs a range of awards in the food retail industry, including:
The Grocer Gold Awards
The Grocer Own Label Food & Drink Awards
The Grocer Food & Drink Awards
Grocery Advertising and Marketing Industry Awards (Gramia)
The Convenience Retail Awards

References

External links
The Grocer home page

1862 establishments in the United Kingdom
Business magazines published in the United Kingdom
Weekly magazines published in the United Kingdom
Magazines established in 1862
Professional and trade magazines